Bhadra Assembly constituency is one of constituencies of Rajasthan Legislative Assembly in the Churu (Lok Sabha constituency).

Bhadra Constituency covers all voters from Bhadra tehsil and part of Nohar tehsil, which includes ILRC Ramgarh.

References

See also 
 Member of the Legislative Assembly (India)

Hanumangarh district
Assembly constituencies of Rajasthan